Penelope (Penny) Horner (born 20 June 1939 in London) is a British former film and television actress.

Life and career
Penelope Horner began her acting career in 1956 in the British film comedy A Touch of the Sun. Other small roles followed in films such as A King in New York and The Nun's Story. In 1961, she played the Anne Rider in  the Edgar Wallace film The Daffodil Mystery as well as Julie Denver in Locker Sixty-Nine in 1962. During the 1960s and 1970s she became a regular face in some of the popular spy adventure series of the day, including The Saint, The Avengers and The Persuaders!. She starred alongside Jack Palance in the 1974 television adaption of Dracula directed by Dan Curtis.

In the 1980s, she appeared as Sarah Hallam in the second and third season of the BBC soap opera Triangle. She retired in 1986.

Penelope married 3 times : 
 David Korda  (1962 - ?) ( divorced before 1981)  
 Rex Berry  (1981 - ?)
 Bjørn Morisse  (? - ?), Norwegian musician and illustrator who died in 2006

Partial filmography

Feature films

1959: The Treasure of San Teresa
1960: The Angry Silence
1961: The Devil's Daffodil
1961: The Horsemasters
1967: Half a Sixpence
1970: The Man Who Had Power Over Women
1977: Holocaust 2000
1984: Escape from El Diablo

Television

1961: Alcoa Presents: One Step Beyond (Episode: The Face)
1961: Boyd Q.C. (Episode: The Runabout)
1962: Edgar Wallace Mysteries - Locker Sixty-Nine
1964: Gideon's Way (Episode: The Big Fix)
1965-1966: The Saint (3 episodes)
1969: The Avengers (Episode: The Morning After)
1971: The Persuaders! (Episode: Someone Waiting)
1974: Dracula
1975: Thriller (Episode: The Double Kill)
1976: Star Maidens (Episode: Escape to Paradise) 
1982-1983: Triangle (52 episodes)
1986: Hell's Bells (6 episodes)

References

External links
 

1939 births
Living people
Actresses from London
English film actresses
English television actresses
English soap opera actresses
20th-century English actresses